Valley of Adeoba, also known as Adeoba Valley, is a valley located on Qeshm, an Iranian island in the Strait of Hormuz in Hormozgan Province. It is located north of the village of Berkeh-ye Khalaf.

References

Landforms of Hormozgan Province
Qeshm County
Valleys of Asia
Tourist attractions in Hormozgan Province